Pixar Animation Studios is a CGI animation production company based in Emeryville, California, United States. Created in 1979 as a division of Lucasfilm, it has been a subsidiary of The Walt Disney Company since 2006. Feature films produced by Pixar have won numerous awards, including eighteen Academy Awards, ten Golden Globe Awards and eleven Grammy Awards.

The following is a list of all the feature films Pixar has released with the nominations and awards they received.

Films

Toy Story
Toy Story was released in 1995 to be the first feature film in history produced using only computer animation. The film, directed by John Lasseter and starring Tom Hanks and Tim Allen, went on to gross over $191 million in the United States during its initial theatrical release, and took in more than $373 million worldwide. Reviews were overwhelmingly positive, praising both the technical innovation of the animation and the wit and sophistication of the screenplay.

A Bug's Life
A Bug's Life (officially trademarked as a bug's life) was released on November 25, 1998 in the United States. It tells the tale of a misfit individualist ant who hires what he thinks are "warrior bugs" (actually circus performers) to protect his colony from greedy grasshoppers. The film was directed by John Lasseter and also marked the last film appearances for Roddy McDowall and Madeline Kahn.

Toy Story 2

Toy Story 2 was released in 1999, directed by John Lasseter, Lee Unkrich and Ash Brannon. The movie keeps most of the original characters and voices from Toy Story, including Tom Hanks, Tim Allen, Don Rickles, Jim Varney, Wallace Shawn, Annie Potts, and  John Ratzenberger. They are joined by new characters voiced by Joan Cusack, Kelsey Grammer, Wayne Knight, and Estelle Harris.

Monsters, Inc.
Monsters, Inc. was released on 2001  in the United States, written by Jack W. Bunting, Jill Culton, Peter Docter, Ralph Eggleston, Dan Gerson, Jeff Pidgeon, Rhett Reese, Jonathan Roberts and Andrew Stanton. It was directed by Pete Docter, Lee Unkrich, and David Silverman.
 
Monsters, Inc. premiered in the United States on October 28, 2001, and went into general release on November 2, 2001 and was a commercial and critical success, grossing over $525 million worldwide during its initial theatrical release. Review aggregator Rotten Tomatoes also reported extremely positive reviews with a fresh 96% approval rating.

Finding Nemo
Finding Nemo was released in 2003, written by Andrew Stanton, directed by Stanton and Lee Unkrich. It tells the story of the overly protective clownfish Marlin (Albert Brooks), who along with a regal tang called Dory (Ellen DeGeneres), searches for his son Nemo (Alexander Gould).  Along the way he learns to take risks and that his son is capable of taking care of himself.

The film received overwhelmingly positive reviews and won the Academy Award for Best Animated Feature, the first Pixar feature to do so. It was a financial blockbuster as it grossed over $867 million worldwide during its initial theatrical release. It is the best-selling DVD of all time, with over 40 million copies sold as of 2006 and is the third highest-grossing G-rated film of all time, behind Toy Story 3 and The Lion King. In 2008, the American Film Institute named it the 10th greatest American Animated film ever made during their 10 Top 10.

The Incredibles
The Incredibles was released in late 2004, written and directed by Brad Bird, who was one of the original directors and executive consultants of The Simpsons and the screenwriter/director of the critically acclaimed 1999 animated film The Iron Giant. The Incredibles was originally developed as a traditionally-animated film for Warner Bros., but after the studio shut down its division for fully animated theatrical features, Bird went to Pixar, where he pitched the story and reunited with John Lasseter. The Incredibles is the first Pixar film to win more than one Academy Award.

Cars
Cars was released in 2006, directed by both John Lasseter and Joe Ranft. It was the seventh Disney/Pixar feature film, and Pixar's last film before the company was bought by Disney. Set in a world populated entirely by anthropomorphic cars and other vehicles, it features the voices of Owen Wilson, Paul Newman (in his final non-documentary feature), Larry the Cable Guy, Bonnie Hunt, Tony Shalhoub, Cheech Marin, Michael Wallis, George Carlin, Paul Dooley, Jenifer Lewis, Guido Quaroni, Michael Keaton, Katherine Helmond, and John Ratzenberger as well as voice cameos by several celebrities including Jeremy Piven, Richard Petty, Dale Earnhardt Jr., Bob Costas, Darrell Waltrip, Jay Leno, Michael Schumacher, and Mario Andretti.

Ratatouille

Ratatouille is a computer-animated film produced by Pixar and distributed by Walt Disney Pictures. The film was released on June 29, 2007 in the United States as the eighth movie produced by Pixar. It was directed by Brad Bird, who took over from Jan Pinkava in 2005. The plot follows Remy, a rat who dreams of becoming a chef and tries to achieve his goal by forming an alliance with a Parisian restaurant's garbage boy. Ratatouille was released to both critical acclaim and box office success, opening in 3,940 theaters domestically and debuting at No. 1 with $47 million, grossing further $206 million in North America and a total of $620 million worldwide. The film is on the 2007 top ten lists of multiple critics, including Michael Sragow of The Baltimore Sun as number one, A.O. Scott of The New York Times, Carina Chocano of the Los Angeles Times and Joe Morgenstern of The Wall Street Journal as number two.

WALL-E

WALL-E (promoted with an interpunct as WALL·E) was released in 2008 and directed by Andrew Stanton. It follows the story of a robot named WALL-E who is designed to clean up a polluted Earth far in the future. He eventually falls in love with another robot named EVE, and follows her into outer space on an adventure.

After directing Finding Nemo, Stanton felt Pixar had created believable simulations of underwater physics and was willing to direct a film set in space. Most of the characters do not have actual human voices, but instead communicate with body language and robotic sounds, designed by Ben Burtt, that resemble voices. In addition, it is the first animated feature by Pixar to have segments featuring live-action characters.

Walt Disney Pictures released it in the United States and Canada on June 27, 2008. The film grossed $23.1 million on its opening day, and $63 million during its opening weekend in 3,992 theaters, ranking #1 at the box office. This ranks the third highest-grossing opening weekend for a Pixar film as of July 2008. Following Pixar tradition, WALL-E was paired with a short film, Presto, for its theatrical release.  WALL-E has achieved highly positive reviews with an approval rating of 96% on the review aggregator Rotten Tomatoes. It grossed $533 million worldwide, won the 2009 Best Animated Film Golden Globe Award and won the Academy Award for Best Animated Feature. It was nominated for a total of six Academy Awards, making it the most nominated Pixar film.

It was nominated for the 2009 Kids' Choice Awards, but lost to Madagascar: Escape 2 Africa.

Up

Up is a 2009 computer-animated film produced by Pixar Animation Studios and distributed by Walt Disney Pictures. The film premiered on May 29, 2009, in North America, and opened the 2009 Cannes Film Festival, becoming the first animated and 3D film to do so. It was directed by Pete Docter, co-directed by Bob Peterson, and produced by Jonas Rivera. The film centers on an elderly widower, named Carl Fredricksen, and a young Wilderness Explorer, named Russell, who fly to South America in a house suspended by helium balloons. The film was released with both critical acclaim and box office success, opening in 3,766 theaters domestically, debuting at #1 with $68.1 million, and grossing $735 million worldwide. and receiving the Golden Tomato, from the website Rotten Tomatoes, for highest rating feature in 2009, with an approval of 98% from film critics, based on 259 reviews.

It garnered various awards and nominations, most of them for the "Best Animated Picture" category and for the film's score. Up was nominated for five Academy Awards at the 2010 Ceremony, winning two of them, for Best Animated Feature and for Best Original Score. It is the second fully animated film to be nominated for Best Picture, the other being Beauty and the Beast, and also become the third consecutive Pixar film to win the Academy Award for Animated Feature, after Ratatouille and WALL-E. The film also won the Golden Globe for Best Original Score and the Best Animated Feature Film at the 67th Golden Globe Awards. The movie received nine nominations for the Annie Awards in eight categories, winning two awards for Best Animated Feature and Best Directing in a Feature Production. It also was selected as the Summer Movie Comedy at the 2009 Teen Choice Awards, and was also nominated for three Grammys at 52nd Grammy Awards, winning two of them. Rivera received the Motion Pictures Motion Picture Producer of the Year Award, for Animated Theatrical Motion Pictures, given by the Producers Guild of America, while Docter and Peterson were honored by the British Academy Film Awards with the BAFTA Award for Best Animated Film, and Giacchino the BAFTA Award for Best Film Music. Furthermore, the film was nominated at the 2009 Satellite Awards in the categories "Best Animated or Mixed Media Film," "Best Original Screenplay" and "Best Original Score." It also won Favorite Animated Movie at the 2010 Kids' Choice Awards.

Toy Story 3

Toy Story 3 is a computer-animated film produced by Pixar and distributed by Walt Disney Pictures. The film was produced by Darla K. Anderson and directed by Lee Unkrich. The film stars Tom Hanks as Sheriff Woody and Tim Allen as Buzz Lightyear. The film also stars Joan Cusack, Don Rickles, Estelle Harris, Blake Clark, Ned Beatty, John Ratzenberger, Wallace Shawn, and Michael Keaton.

The film opened on June 18, 2010, to receive universal acclaim and box office success, grossing $1.067 billion; it is the 30th highest-grossing film of all time, the fifth highest-grossing animated film of all time, and Pixar's second highest-grossing film of all time.

Cars 2

Cars 2 is a computer-animated film produced by Pixar and distributed by Walt Disney Pictures. The films produced by Denise Ream and directed by John Lasseter and Brad Lewis. The film stars Owen Wilson, Larry the Cable Guy, Michael Caine, Emily Mortimer, Eddie Izzard, John Turturro, and Jason Isaacs.

The film released on June 24, 2011. Despite being the first and so far the only Pixar film to receive mixed reviews from critics, it was a commercial success, earning a total of $562 million.

Cars 2 was the first Pixar film not to be nominated for any Academy Awards.

It was nominated for the 2012 Kids' Choice Awards, but lost to Puss in Boots.

Brave

Brave is a computer-animated film produced by Pixar and distributed by Walt Disney Pictures. The films produced by Katherine Sarafian and directed by Mark Andrews, Brenda Chapman and Steve Purcell. The film stars Kelly Macdonald, Julie Walters, Billy Connolly, Emma Thompson, Kevin McKidd, Craig Ferguson, and Robbie Coltrane.

The film released on June 22, 2012. The film received positive reviews from critics, and was a box office success, earning a total of $540 million.

It was nominated for the 2013 Kids' Choice Awards, but lost to Wreck-It Ralph.

Monsters University

Monsters University is a computer-animated film produced by Pixar Animation Studios and released by Walt Disney Pictures. It was directed by Dan Scanlon and produced by Kori Rae. It is the fourteenth film produced by Pixar and is a prequel to 2001's Monsters, Inc., marking the first time Pixar has made a prequel film.

Billy Crystal, John Goodman, Steve Buscemi, Bob Peterson, and John Ratzenberger reprise their roles as Mike Wazowski, James P. Sullivan, Randall Boggs, Roz, and the Abominable Snowman, respectively. Bonnie Hunt, who played Ms. Flint in the first film, voices Mike's grade school teacher, Ms. Karen Graves. Monsters University premiered on June 5, 2013 at the BFI Southbank in London, United Kingdom and was released on June 21, 2013, in the United States.

The film received positive reviews and was a box office success, grossing $744 million against its estimated budget of $200 million.

It is the second Pixar film not to have been nominated for any Academy Awards, after Cars 2. Monsters University was nominated for the 2014 Kids' Choice Awards, but lost to Frozen.

Inside Out

Inside Out is a computer-animated comedy-drama adventure film, co-written and directed by Pete Docter. The film was released at 2015 Cannes Film Festival on May 18, 2015 and on June 19, 2015 in United States by Walt Disney Studios Motion Pictures. Inside Out opened across 3,946 theaters in the United States and Canada, of which 3,100 showed the film in 3D, and grossed $90.4 million on its opening weekend, ranking #2 at the box office, behind Jurassic World. The film has accumulated over $857 million in worldwide box office revenue.

Inside Out was critically acclaimed, with an approval rating of 98% on the review aggregator Rotten Tomatoes, as well as being included in many critics' Top Ten Films of 2015 lists. The film won the Academy Award for Best Animated Feature and was nominated for Best Original Screenplay at the 88th Academy Awards. It received ten Annie Award wins at 43rd Annie Awards, including Outstanding Achievement in Directing in an Animated Feature Production for Pete Docter, Outstanding Achievement in Voice Acting in an Animated Feature Production for Phyllis Smith and Best Animated Feature. The American Film Institute selected Inside Out as one of the Top Ten Films of the year. The film received a Golden Globe Award for Best Animated Feature Film at the 73rd Golden Globe Awards. It received three Critics' Choice Movie Award nominations including Best Animated Feature.

The Good Dinosaur

The Good Dinosaur is a computer-animated comedy-drama adventure film produced by Pixar Animation Studios and released by Walt Disney Pictures. The film was directed by Peter Sohn from a screenplay by Meg LeFauve. Set in a world in which dinosaurs never became extinct, the film follows a young Apatosaurus named Arlo, who meets an unlikely human friend while traveling through a harsh and mysterious landscape. The film stars Raymond Ochoa, Jack Bright, Sam Elliott, Anna Paquin, A. J. Buckley, Jeffrey Wright, Frances McDormand and Steve Zahn. The Good Dinosaur had its premiere on November 10, 2015 in Paris, and was released in the United States on November 25, 2015.

The film, along with Inside Out, marks the first time that Pixar has released two feature films in the same year. The Good Dinosaur received positive reviews from critics, but underperformed at the box office, grossing $332 million against a budget of $175–200 million.

It is the third Pixar film not to have been nominated for any Academy Awards, after Cars 2 and Monsters University.

Finding Dory

Finding Dory is a computer-animated comedy-drama film produced by Pixar Animation Studios and released by Walt Disney Pictures. Directed and co-written by Andrew Stanton with co-direction by Angus MacLane in his feature debut, the screenplay was co-written by Victoria Strouse and Stanton. The film is a sequel to 2003's Finding Nemo. The film features the returning voices of Ellen DeGeneres and Albert Brooks, with Hayden Rolence (replacing Alexander Gould), Ed O'Neill, Kaitlin Olson, Ty Burrell, Diane Keaton, and Eugene Levy joining the cast.

The film premiered at the El Capitan Theatre in Los Angeles on June 8, 2016, and was released in the United States on June 17, 2016. It received positive reviews and has grossed over $1 billion worldwide.

It is the fourth Pixar film not to have been nominated for any Academy Awards, after Cars 2, Monsters University and The Good Dinosaur.

Cars 3

Cars 3 is a computer-animated sports comedy-drama film produced by Pixar and released by Walt Disney Pictures. Directed by Brian Fee in his directorial debut, the screenplay was written by Kiel Murray, Bob Peterson and Mike Rich. The returning voices of Owen Wilson, Bonnie Hunt, and Larry the Cable Guy are joined by Cristela Alonzo, Chris Cooper, Armie Hammer, Nathan Fillion, Kerry Washington, and Lea DeLaria.

It is the fifth Pixar film not to have been nominated for any Academy Awards, after Cars 2, Monsters University, The Good Dinosaur, and Finding Dory.

Coco

Coco is a 2017 American 3D computer-animated fantasy film produced by Pixar Animation Studios and released by Walt Disney Pictures. The film was directed by Lee Unkrich and was based on an original idea by Unkrich with the screenplay written by Adrian Molina (who also co-directed) and Matthew Aldrich.

Incredibles 2

Incredibles 2 is a 2018 American computer-animated superhero film produced by Pixar Animation Studios and distributed by Walt Disney Pictures. Written and directed by Brad Bird, it is a sequel to The Incredibles (2004) and the second full-length installment of the franchise. The film features the returning voices of Craig T. Nelson, Holly Hunter, Sarah Vowell, Samuel L. Jackson, and Brad Bird with Huckleberry Milner (replacing Spencer Fox), Bob Odenkirk, Catherine Keener, and Jonathan Banks (replacing Bud Luckey) joining the cast.

Toy Story 4

Toy Story 4 is a 2019 American computer-animated comedy film produced by Pixar Animation Studios for Walt Disney Pictures. It is the fourth installment in Pixar's Toy Story series and the sequel to Toy Story 3 (2010). It was directed by Josh Cooley (in his feature directorial debut) from a screenplay by Andrew Stanton and Stephany Folsom; the three also conceived the story alongside John Lasseter, Rashida Jones, Will McCormack, Valerie LaPointe, and Martin Hynes. Tom Hanks, Tim Allen, Annie Potts, Joan Cusack, Wallace Shawn, John Ratzenberger, Estelle Harris, Blake Clark, Bonnie Hunt, Jeff Garlin, and Timothy Dalton reprise their character roles from the first three films. They are joined by Tony Hale, Keegan-Michael Key, Jordan Peele, Christina Hendricks, Keanu Reeves, and Ally Maki.

Onward

Onward is a 2020 American computer-animated urban fantasy-adventure film produced by Pixar Animation Studios and released by Walt Disney Pictures. The film is directed by Dan Scanlon, produced by Kori Rae and written by Scanlon, Jason Headley, and Keith Bunin, and stars the voices of Tom Holland, Chris Pratt, Julia Louis-Dreyfus, and Octavia Spencer.

Soul

Soul is a 2020 American computer-animated fantasy comedy-drama film produced by Pixar Animation Studios and released by Walt Disney Pictures. Directed by Pete Docter and co-directed by Kemp Powers, the film stars the voices of Jamie Foxx, Tina Fey, Graham Norton, Rachel House, Alice Braga, Richard Ayoade, Phylicia Rashad, Donnell Rawlings, Questlove, and Angela Bassett.

Luca

Luca is a 2021 American computer-animated coming-of-age fantasy film produced by Pixar Animation Studios and distributed by Walt Disney Studios Motion Pictures. The film was directed by Enrico Casarosa (in his feature-length directorial debut), written by Jesse Andrews and Mike Jones, from a story by Casarosa, Andrews, and Simon Stephenson, produced by Andrea Warren, and features the voices of Jacob Tremblay and Jack Dylan Grazer, with Emma Berman, Saverio Raimondo, Marco Barricelli, Maya Rudolph, Jim Gaffigan, Peter Sohn, Lorenzo Crisci, Marina Massironi, and Sandy Martin in supporting roles.

Turning Red

Turning Red is a 2022 American computer-animated fantasy comedy film produced by Pixar Animation Studios and distributed by Walt Disney Studios Motion Pictures. It was directed by Domee Shi (in her feature directorial debut) and produced by Lindsey Collins, from a screenplay written by Shi and Julia Cho, and a story by Shi, Cho, and Sarah Streicher. The film marks the first Pixar feature film solely directed by a woman. It stars the voices of Rosalie Chiang, Sandra Oh, Ava Morse, Hyein Park, Maitreyi Ramakrishnan, Orion Lee, Wai Ching Ho, Tristan Allerick Chen, and James Hong. Set in Toronto, Ontario in 2002, the film follows Meilin "Mei" Lee (Chiang), a 13-year-old Chinese-Canadian student who transforms into a giant red panda when she experiences any strong emotion, due to a hereditary curse.

Lightyear

Lightyear is a computer-animated sports comedy-drama film produced by Pixar and released by Walt Disney Pictures.The film is a spin-off of the Toy Story film series, but does not take place in the same fictional universe as them; rather, it is presented as a film that some of the characters in the main Toy Story films have seen. Lightyear centers on the character Buzz Lightyear, who in this film is human and not a toy. Directed by Angus MacLane in his directorial debut the screenplay was written by the director himself, MacLane, and Jason Headley. The film stars Chris Evans as the voice of the titular character, with Keke Palmer, Peter Sohn, Taika Waititi, Dale Soules, James Brolin, and Uzo Aduba in supporting roles.  

It is the sixth Pixar film not to have been nominated for any Academy Awards, after Cars 2, Monsters University, The Good Dinosaur, Finding Dory and Cars 3.

Notes

See also
 List of Pixar awards and nominations
 Pixar Animation Studios

References

External links
 Official Website of the Academy Awards
 Official Website of the Grammys
 Official Website of the Annie Awards
 Official Website of the Golden Globe Awards

Feature films
Lists of accolades by franchises